McCreary Moves In is a 1958 novel by Morris West writing under the name "Michael East".

Premise
Mick McCreary is an unemployed oilman offered to run a drilling operation on a remote island. He gets involved in murder, intrigue and fraud.

Reception
The Pacific Island Monthly called it "a  piece   of   lurid adventure  fiction." The Sydney Morning Herald called it "Bigges plus sex."

TV series
It was adapted into a 1957 TV series in England by ABC Weekend Television of 7 episodes of 30 minutes.

References

External links
TV series at IMDb

1958 novels
Works by Morris West